Hwang Jin-Woo (Korean: 황진우. Hanja: 黄眞宇. born 15 August 1983) is a South Korean auto racing driver. He won the  Korean GT championship in 2005 and 2006 and moved to the Japanese Super GT series in 2008.

In 2008 he also drove the A1 Team Korea car in the 2008–09 A1 Grand Prix season.

In 2017 he raced in the Korean Superrace saloon car championship.

References

External links
Profile – Super GT official website 

1983 births
Living people
South Korean racing drivers
A1 Team Korea drivers
Super GT drivers

A1 Grand Prix drivers
Carlin racing drivers